East Hertfordshire is a local government district in Hertfordshire, England. Its council is based in Hertford, the county town of Hertfordshire. The largest town in the district is Bishop's Stortford, and the other main towns are Ware, Buntingford and Sawbridgeworth. At the 2011 Census, the population of the district was 137,687.

The district was formed on 1 April 1974, under the Local Government Act 1972, by the merger of the municipal borough of Hertford with Bishop's Stortford, Sawbridgeworth and Ware urban districts, and Braughing Rural District, Ware Rural District and part of Hertford Rural District. By area it is the largest of the ten local government districts in Hertfordshire. It borders the North Hertfordshire district and the boroughs of Stevenage, Welwyn Hatfield and Broxbourne in Hertfordshire, and the districts of Epping Forest, Harlow and Uttlesford in Essex.

In the 2006 edition of Channel 4's "Best and Worst Places to Live in the UK", East Hertfordshire was rated the seventh-best district to live in. In 2012, East Hertfordshire came ninth in Halifax bank's annual survey of most desirable places to live. It came first in this survey in 2020.

Transport

The district contains only one motorway - a small stretch of the M11 at Bishop's Stortford. The major roads within the district include:

A10 - (north-south) from London to Cambridge: enters after Hoddesdon, Hertfordshire, leaves before Royston dualled.

A414 - (WSW-ENE) from Welwyn to Harlow, through Hertford, where it forms the Hertford by-pass.

A602 - (SE-NW), connecting at A10 at Ware with the A1(M) at Stevenage.

A120 - (west-east) connecting the A10 at Standon with the M11 at Bishop's Stortford.

None of the above roads are classified as trunk roads. Therefore, they are maintained by Hertfordshire County Council while responsibility for the M11 rests with the Highways Agency.

Stansted Airport is just beyond the edge of the district near Bishop's Stortford, but officially sits within Uttlesford district in neighbouring Essex. Many of the district's towns have rail services into London at King's Cross, Moorgate, and Liverpool Street.

Employment

The district's biggest employer is the pharmaceutical company GlaxoSmithKline, which has a research and manufacturing centre in Ware. The company also has a large research centre and office in neighbouring Stevenage.

Parishes

The district is entirely parished. See List of civil parishes in Hertfordshire.

Council 

The council is responsible for a range of local services including refuse and recycling collection, planning, building control, licensing, housing, parking and council tax collection. The council is officially called 'East Hertfordshire District Council', but its corporate branding is 'East Herts Council'.

The council is currently controlled by the Conservatives, who won 40 of the 50 council seats at the last elections in 2019.

Initially referred to in legislation with only a reference of 'Hertfordshire 3', it gained the name East Hertfordshire through The English Non-Metropolitan Districts (Names) Order 1973. The initial wards were laid down in The County of Hertfordshire (District Wards) Order 1973, and were subsequently revised in The District of East Hertfordshire (Electoral Arrangements) Order 1976 and The District of East Hertfordshire (Electoral changes) Order 1998.

The first elections to the new Authority were held in 1973, and the new council structures came into force on 1 April 1974.

The boundaries of East Hertfordshire District Council have remained largely unchanged since 1972, although some minor alterations have been made. In 1982, part of the parish of Aston was transferred from Stevenage District Council to East Hertfordshire. In 1985, East Hertfordshire and Welwyn Hatfield Borough exchanged parcels of land in the Tewin and Datchworth areas. In 1992 the boundary between Hertfordshire and Essex was realigned to better respect natural boundaries. Changes were made in the Albury, Bishop's Stortford, Eastwick, Gilston, Hunsdon, Sawbridgeworth, Stansted Abbots and Thorley parishes. In total the parts of Essex transferred to Hertfordshire had a total area of 170 hectares, and 500 inhabitants, and the parts of Hertfordshire transferred to Essex had a total area of 260 hectares and a population of 60. In 2013, an area of Walkern parish with 19 properties was transferred to Stevenage Borough.

Responsibilities 
Hertfordshire has three-tier local government, meaning responsibilities for local government are split between County Councils, District Councils, and Parish Councils. The division between the between the responsibilities is laid down in law. The Local Government Association has summarised the divisions between Counties and Districts (the two main levels of councils) as follows:

Governance 
The overall policies and budget of the council are determined by full council meetings of East Herts, comprising all 50 members of the authority. In common with most other English local authorities, East Herts operates the 'leader with executive' governance model. Under these arrangements, full council chooses one of its members to be the leader of the council. In turn, the leader appoints at least two and no more than nine other councillors to be the executive. Most of the day-to-day member-level decision making of the council is undertaken by the executive.

The role of the executive, as defined by Section 6.5.1 of the council's constitution is to:

"(a) make key decisions as defined in Part 2, Chapter 11 and published in the Forward Plan;

(b) formulate the annual budget and Policy Framework for submission to Council in accordance with the budget and Policy Framework procedure rules in Part 4 of the Constitution;

(c) implement the approved budget and Policy Framework;

(d) determine recommendations and other matters referred to it by committees, sub-committees or the Council;

(e) carry out all of the functions which by law the Executive must carry out or it has chosen to carry out and which have not been delegated elsewhere; and

(f) ensure the publication of, and to consider, the plan of items likely to come before it for decision at least 28 days before the decision is due to be made."

Councillors, including those who are not members of the Executive, sit on committees which currently include:

The two Scrutiny committees work to improve the delivery of policies and services by scrutinising the Executive, advising on new policy areas and testing existing policy responses.

In addition, members sit on quasi-judicial committees such as Development Management and Licensing. The Development Management Committee deals with planning applications and planning enforcement matters. The Licensing Committee deals with statutory provisions relating to liquor, taxi, gaming, entertainment, food and miscellaneous licensing and health and safety functions. Members on these committees are expressly forbidden from having a 'party whip', and have to make decisions based on the legislative framework.

As with all other English councils, East Hertfordshire also operates a scheme of delegation, which means that many operational decisions are taken by paid council officers rather than councillors. Examples of decisions taken by officers rather than councillors would be determination of routine planning and licensing applications, with the more complex or contentious decisions being taken by councillors in committee.

As a consequence of the Local Government and Housing Act 1989, the council follows political proportionality in the appointment of councillors to individual committees. The aim is to ensure the political composition of those committees reflects the political representation of the Council. These rules do not apply to the Executive, which can be composed entirely of members of one political group.

Election Results 

East Hertfordshire District Council elects its 50 councillors through whole council elections every four years. The next elections are due to be held in 2023. By-elections are held when a casual vacancy arises due to death, resignation or disqualification.

The Conservative Party has won a majority in each election since 1999. However, the district is not unwaveringly Conservative. The party lost control in the 1995-1999 council term, and did not control the authority during the council's first three year term of 1973-1976. 

The Council had 48 members at the 1973 and 1976 elections, afterwards the council had 50 members.

Wards

East Hertfordshire consists of thirty wards, and are a mixture of 1, 2 and 3 member wards. These wards are split between three parliamentary constituencies: Hertford and Stortford, North East Hertfordshire and Stevenage. 

The Local Government Boundary Commission for England has been conducting a boundary review in 2022-23. In March 2022 made initial proposals on new ward boundaries which would take effect from the next all-out council elections in May 2023. Final recommendations are due in August 2022.

Leaders of the Council 
Political leadership is provided by the leader of the council. Since 2015 the leader has been Linda Haysey, a Conservative. Former leaders are listed with the council's historic election results.

Chairman of the Council 

The chairman of East Hertfordshire District Council is the ceremonial head of the council, first citizen of district and the chair of full council meetings. At full council meetings, the chairman must ensure the smooth running of meetings, uphold the constitution, interpret the rules of procedure and maintain an 'apolitical stance.' The chairman may, though, exercise a casting vote in the case of a tied vote with 'complete freedom of conscience.' The chairman is forbidden by the constitution from being a member of the Executive. The chairman is elected annually by Council.

See also 
 East Hertfordshire District Council elections
 The Hundred Parishes

References

External links
 East Hertfordshire District Council official website

 
Districts of Hertfordshire